Pyongyang University of Science and Technology (PUST) is North Korea's first privately funded university. It is founded, operated, and partly funded by associations and people outside the country. PUST was jointly planned and constructed by forces from both North and South Korea, along with contributions from groups and individuals  from other nations, in particular China and the United States. The initiative is largely funded by Evangelical Christian movements. Originally scheduled for launch in 2003, the project was delayed for several years and began operations in October 2010.

History
The university is located in the countryside outside of Pyongyang in a separate but nearby administrative region with permission required to enter and exit the campus. After introductory negotiations, PUST project started in 2001, as an initiative of Professor Kim Chin Kyung, endorsed in a personal meeting with former North Korean leader Kim Jong-Il. Professor Kim is the founding president of Yanbian University of Science and Technology (YUST) in northeastern China inside the Yanbian Korean Autonomous Prefecture, founded in 1992. PUST has cooperated with YUST and drew on their experiences.

With the exception of foreign language courses, all teaching is conducted in English. All foreign faculty work as volunteers and most come from a Christian background, with the founding president and now chairman saying:
"While the skills to be taught are technical in nature, the spirit underlying this historic venture is unabashedly Christian...."

PUST construction plans were politically troubled and slowed down in 2005 and 2006, in connection with the 2006 North Korean nuclear test, but later on were resumed and completed. PUST celebrated its grand opening in September 2009 and its official opening in October 2010. It had planned to enrol up to 200 higher-level students per year, from both parts of Korea. Plans include the hiring of up to 250 faculty members from universities and research institutions in South Korea, China, the United States, and other countries. PUST classes began in the fall of October 2010. As a joint venture university, PUST is seen as a contribution to the Korean reunification process.

Kim Hak Song, who managed a farm run by the agriculture department of the university, was detained on charges of committing “hostile criminal acts” against the country on 6 May 2017. Kim Sang-duk, who also worked for the university, had been arrested on similar charges on April 22. They both were released on May 8, 2018, into U.S. Secretary of State Mike Pompeo's custody after overtures were made for a meeting to be held between President Donald Trump and Supreme Leader Kim Jong-un in June 2018.

Due to a ban on Americans travelling to North Korea issued by the U.S. State Department in mid-July in 2017, the university had to start the fall semester without its dozens of American staffers in September, who comprised roughly 60 out of 130 foreigners at the university, including faculty members, staffers and family members, as none of them received special permission to stay.

On October 3, 2019, PUST officially celebrated its 10-year anniversary by holding an international Conference (ICoPUST2019) on campus with more than 30 prominent international speakers.

Subjects
The goal of PUST is to contribute to North Korean economic development by producing professionals and leaders in technical disciplines, who are fluent in English and another foreign language (such as Chinese or German), and who are accustomed to working in an international setting. Bachelor of Science and doctorate degrees will be awarded in Electrical and Computer Engineering (ECE), Agriculture and Life Sciences (ALS), International Finance and Management (IFM), and Medical Sciences (DMS). The university has plans to open Construction Engineering as early as 2013.

Graduate students and professors have internet access, but it is filtered and monitored.

See also

 List of universities in North Korea
 Suki Kim – author of Without You, There Is No Us: My Secret Life Teaching the Sons of North Korea’s Elite, a book about her experience teaching at PUST

References

Further reading

External links
 Official website
 Official NGO website in America
 Communication for Yust Pust community

Universities in North Korea
Education in Pyongyang
Educational institutions established in 2010
2010 establishments in North Korea